UFC Fight Night: Rockhold vs. Bisping (also known as UFC Fight Night 55) was a mixed martial arts event held at the Allphones Arena in Sydney, New South Wales, Australia on November 8, 2014.

Background
This event was the fourth event that the UFC hosted in Sydney and the sixth event to take place in Australia. The last time the UFC was in Sydney was for UFC on FX: Alves vs. Kampmann on March 3, 2012.

Ray Borg was expected to face Richie Vaculik at this event. However, Borg was forced to pull out of the event due to injury and was replaced by Neil Seery.  Subsequently, Seery pulled out of that bout as well and was replaced by Louis Smolka.

Patrick Williams was expected to face Jumabieke Tuerxun at the event. However, Williams was forced out of the bout due to injury and was replaced by Marcus Brimage.

A scheduled featherweight bout between Mark Eddiva and Mike De La Torre was cancelled after both fighters suffered injuries.

Daniel Omielańczuk was expected to face Soa Palelei at this event. However, Omielańczuk was forced to pull out of this event due to injury and was replaced by Walt Harris.

Aljamain Sterling was expected to face Frankie Saenz, though Saenz was forced to withdraw from the bout.  Promotional newcomer Michael Imperato was briefly linked as a replacement.  However, his signing was quickly rescinded and as a result, Sterling was pulled from the event altogether.

The event holds the record of having the most finishes on a single modern UFC card with 11 finishes, for a rate of 1.000. UFC 224 would later tie this record on May 12, 2018, but at a finishing rate of 0.846. UFC 281 on November 12, 2022 also had eleven finishes to tie this record.

Results

Bonus awards
The following fighters were awarded $50,000 bonuses:

Fight of the Night: Robert Whittaker vs. Clint Hester
Performance of the Night: Luke Rockhold and Louis Smolka

See also

2014 in UFC
List of UFC events
Mixed martial arts in Australia

References

UFC Fight Night
Mixed martial arts in Australia
Sports competitions in Sydney
2014 in mixed martial arts
2014 in Australian sport